The 2015 Sparta Prague Open was a professional tennis tournament played on clay courts. It was the second edition of the tournament which was part of the 2015 ATP Challenger Tour. It took place in Prague, Czech Republic between 8 and 13 June 2015.

Singles main-draw entrants

Seeds 

 1 Rankings as of 25 May 2015.

Other entrants 
The following players received wildcards into the singles main draw:
  Djordje Djokovic
  Dominik Kellovský
  Zdeněk Kolář
  Patrik Rikl

The following players received entry from the qualifying draw:
  Rogério Dutra Silva
  Kamil Majchrzak
  Marek Michalička
  Jan Šátral

Doubles main-draw entrants

Seeds

1 Rankings as of May 25, 2015.

Other entrants
The following pairs received wildcards into the doubles main draw:
  Dominik Kellovský /  Henri Laaksonen
  Tomáš Papík /  Matěj Vocel
  Patrik Rikl /  Pavel Štaubert

Champions

Singles 

  Norbert Gombos def.  Albert Montañés, 7–6(7–5), 5–7, 7–6(7–2).

Doubles 

  Mateusz Kowalczyk /  Igor Zelenay def.  Roberto Maytín /  Miguel Ángel Reyes-Varela, 6–2, 7–6(7–5).

External links 
 

2015 ATP Challenger Tour
2015
2015 in Czech tennis